In Greek mythology, Lichas was the Spartan who discovered the bones of Orestes.  The remains of Orestes were required, according to a Delphic Oracle, in order for Sparta to defeat Tegea (Herodotus The Histories 1.68).

Another Spartan named Lichas lived in the late fifth century B.C. During the Pentecontaetia, Cimon was becoming more and more powerful among the Athenians as he began to spend money to feed the poor, regularly inviting them into his home, and spending more on honoring gods such as Hermes. Seeing the popularity he was gaining in this manner, the younger Lichas began to finance and organize festivals in order to entertain boys involved in gymnastics. In this way he gained popularity in Sparta.

Greek mythology
Ancient Spartans